Leon Walton (May 18, 1936 – October 20, 2013), better known by his stage name Leon Ashley, was an American country music singer. He is known mainly for his single "Laura (What's He Got That I Ain't Got)", which topped the country singles charts in 1967. This single was distributed on his own label. Ashley wrote, recorded, released, distributed and published the single on his own. Besides this song, he released several other singles throughout the 1960s and 1970s.

Biography
Leon Walton was born on May 18, 1936, in Covington, Georgia. He first performed at age nine on a local radio show, and released his first single in 1960 on Goldband Records. This single did not attract significant airplay, neither did later releases on Imperial Records and Dot Records. Ashley eventually married singer Margie Singleton.

In 1964, Ashley founded his own label, Ashley Records. The label's releases proved more successful than his releases on Goldband and Imperial, with one Ashley Records release — "Laura (What's He Got That I Ain't Got)" — becoming his only number 1 country hit that year. This song made him the first country music artist "to write, record, release, distribute and publish his own material", according to Allmusic. An album, also entitled Laura (What's He Got That I Ain't Got), reached No. 10 on the Top Country Albums chart. He had several more hit singles soon afterward, including more duets with Singleton, as well as a duets album on the Ashley label. One single, "While Your Lover Sleeps", reached No. 1 on the Canadian country charts. His chart success waned by 1969, however, and he shifted his focus to songwriting for other artists. Brook Benton and Frankie Laine concurrently sent of "Laura" to the pop and A.C. charts in 1969, and Claude King sent a version to the lower regions of the country charts shortly after Ashley's version fell from the top of the charts. Marty Robbins also charted in 1973 with it, and Kenny Rogers sent a cover to No. 19 three years later.

Ashley died in Hendersonville, Tennessee on October 20, 2013, after a lengthy illness.

Discography

Albums

Singles

APeaked at No. 20 on Bubbling Under Hot 100.

References

1936 births
2013 deaths
American country singer-songwriters
American male singer-songwriters
People from Covington, Georgia
Country musicians from Georgia (U.S. state)
Singer-songwriters from Georgia (U.S. state)